The 1974 Cork Senior Football Championship was the 86th staging of the Cork Senior Football Championship since its establishment by the Cork County Board in 1887. The draw for the opening round fixtures took place on 27 January 1974. The championship began on 7 April 1974 and ended on 6 October 1974.

University College Cork entered the championship as the defending champions, however, they were beaten by St. Nicholas' in the first round.

On 6 October 1974, Nemo Rangers won the championship following a 2-08 to 1-08 defeat of Carbery in the final. This was their second championship title overall and their first title since 1972.

Carbery's Tony Murphy was the championship's top scorer with 0-22.

Team changes

To Championship

Promoted from the Cork Intermediate Football Championship
 Canovee

From Championship

Regraded to the Cork Intermediate Football Championship
 Newcestown

Results

First round

Second round

Quarter-finals

Semi-finals

Final

Championship statistics

Top scorers

Overall

In a single game

References

Cork Senior Football Championship